Monolithic is a synthpop music project started and maintained by Michael Babbitt.  Its music includes subgenres such as breakbeat, trance, EBM, techno, industrial, and downtempo.  Monolithic's music has been described as "intense", "meaningful", "emotional", and "powerful."

In January 2006, Babbitt announced that he was canceling his then-upcoming Monolithic album Evil Behind Smiling Eyes to focus on other projects.

MIDIhead
Michael (MIDIhead) Babbitt is sole member of Monolithic.  He started his music career at the age of 14 when he went to a Battle of the DJs with a box of cassette tapes. He did poorly at his first performance, coming in last place, but he learned from the experience and later trained under more experienced DJs.  At eighteen he helped a friend start a nightclub called The Ivy Tower which was housed in a former church. In 2000, Babbitt released his first solo album under the moniker of Monolithic. This album won Best Album of 2001 at the American Synthpop awards in Hollywood. His award was presented by former Information Society frontman, Kurt Harland at the famed Hotel Rosevelt Hotel ballroom.

Babbitt has worked on remixes, TV, and motion picture trailers, such as Access Hollywood, MTV, The Matrix Reloaded, Dark Angel, America's Next Top Model, Prison Break, Dexter to name a few, as well as multiple Dance, Dance, Revolution video games.

In addition to writing and producing music, Babbitt also has experience in sound design and has created patch libraries for Spectrasonics Omnisphere, distributed by ILIO.

His latest release called "Anthology" is a collection of 32 songs, spanning 20 years of songwriting under his Monolithic moniker and can be found at many online music streaming and digital download providers.

Discography

as Monolithic

Full-length albums 
 Power Undiminished (2000)
 Dividing Asunder (2002)
 Fall Awake - EP (2010)
 Evil Behind Smiling Eyes (2014)
 Illumina Tenebris (2016)
 Anthology (2018)

Singles 

 Lulling Us to Sleep (2002)
 House of Joy (2002)

Other 
 Evil Behind Smiling Eyes - Collection 1 [Limited MP3-only pre-release of the full-length album] (2005)
 In My Eyes (Midihead Remix) (2004) Original song by Akira Yamaoka.

as Midihead 
 Midihead EP (2009 Fixt)

References

External links
Official Web site

American synth-pop groups
Video game musicians